The following article presents a summary of the 2006–07 football (soccer) season in Croatia, which was the 16th season of competitive football in the country.

League competitions

Croatian First Division

Croatian Second Division

Croatian clubs in Europe

Summary

Dinamo Zagreb

Rijeka

Varteks

Osijek

References